Jagaddhatri is an 2022 Indian Bengali language Romantic Thriller Drama television series that premiered on 29 August 2022 on Bengali General Television Entertainment Channel Zee Bangla and it also available on the digital platform Zee5. The show is produced by Snehasish Chakraborty of Blues Productions and stars Ankita Mallick and Soumyadeep Mukherjee in lead roles. It was dubbed in Odia as Jagruti currently broadcast on Zee Sarthak .

Plot
The story involves around an orphan girl Jagaddhatri and a rich boy who both are friends and are crime officers. Jagaddhatri is a secret crime branch officer but no one knows her real identity.

Cast

Main
Ankita Mallick as Jagaddhatri Mukherjee (née Sanyal) aka Jas Sanyal – a special crime branch officer, Deb and Shikha's daughter, Swayambhu's wife, Mehendi's step sister.
Soumyadeep Mukherjee as Swayambhu Mukherjee – a special crime branch officer, Jagaddhatri's husband, Utsav's step brother.

Recurring
Kanchana Moitra as Shakuntala Sanyal: Deb's second wife; Jagaddhatri's step mother; Mehendi and Mouma's mother.
Biplab Banerjee as Deb Sanyal: Jagaddhatri, Mehendi and Mouma's father; Late Shikha's former husband, Shakuntala's husband.
Sanchari Das / Ritu Rai Acharya as Mehendi Mukherjee (née Sanyal) : Deb and Shakuntala's daughter; Jagaddhatri's half sister; Mouma's sister; Utsab's wife.
Soma Dey as Mahasweta Sanyal: Deb and Nupur's mother; Jagaddhatri, Mehendi, Mouma, Upasana and Aradhana's Grandmother. 
Shobhana Bhunia as Upasana: Nupur's daughter; Aradhana's sister; Jagaddhatri, Mehendi, Mouma's cousin sister.
Somashree Chaki as Nupur: Deb's sister; Upasana and Aradhana's mother; Jagaddhatri, Mehendi, Mouma's aunt.
Roshni Ghosh as Aradhana: Nupur's daughter; Upasana's sister; Jagaddhatri, Mehendi, Mouma's cousin sister
Sahamita Acharya as Mouma Sanyal: Jagaddhatri's half sister, Deb and Shakuntala's daughter; Mehendi's sister. 
Gourav Ghoshal as Menan - a dreaded gangster and mafia.
Rupsha Chakraborty as Koushiki Mukherjee
Aditya Chowdhury as Samaresh Chatterjee: Koushiki's husband
Arka Chakraborty as Utsav Mukherjee: Rajnath and Boidehi's son; Swayambhu's half brother; Sangvi and Shayna's brother; Jagaddhatri's former Boyfriend; Mehendi's husband; Kaushiki's cousin brother; Menan's right hand. 
Moumita Gupta as Boidehi Mukherjee - Rajnath's second wife; Utsav, Sangvi and Shayna's mother; Swayambhu's step mother.
Supriyo Dutta as Rajnath Mukherjee - Boidehi's husband; Swayambhu, Utsav, Sangvi and Shayna's father.
Tapashi Roy Chowdhury as Bhargabi Mukherjee: Dibanath's wife; Koushiki's mother 
Manishankar Banerjee as Dibanath Mukherjee: Rajnath's brother; Bhargabi's husband; Koushiki's father   
Rupsha Chatterjee as Gorima Mukherjee: Prity's sister: Koushiki, Utsav, Sangvi and Shayna's cousin sister, Gunjon's love interest 
Payel Tarafdar as Shayna Mukherjee: Rajnath and Boidehi's daughter; Swayambhu's half sister; Utsav and Sangvi's sister; Kaushiki's cousin sister 
Prarona Bhattacharjee as Sangvi Mukherjee: Rajnath and Boidehi's daughter; Swayambhu's half sister; Utsav and Shayna's sister; Kaushiki's cousin sister; Shambo's would be wife 
Sougata Dasgupta as Gunjon; Gorima's love interest
Twarita Chatterjee as Prity: Debu's wife; Koushiki, Utsav, Sangvi and Shayna's cousin sister
Debjay Mallick as Debu: Prity's husband
Priya Paul as Divya Sen: Samaresh's love interest; Koushiki's rival
Sukanya Chatterjee as Shorindri: A Reporter; Utsav's former lover
Subhajit Banerjee as Inspector Bagchi
Amitava Das as Pritam Laha
Meghna Mukherjee as Pritam's wife
Raja Kundu as Shambo: Shalini's brother; Sangvi's would be husband 
Suravi Sanyal as Shalini

Reception

TRP Ratings

2022

2023

Soundtracks

References

Zee Bangla original programming
Bengali-language television programming in India
2022 Indian television series debuts
Indian drama television series